Father Brian Kolodiejchuk, MC, Ph.D. was the advocate for Mother Teresa of Calcutta in the cause for her canonization, and director of the Mother Teresa Center.

He edited and wrote the commentary for the book Mother Teresa: Come Be My Light, published by Doubleday, on September 4, 2007.

Biography

Career
Father Kolodiejchuk's 20-year association with Mother Teresa began in 1977 when he joined a new group of contemplative brothers she was then starting. He later joined the priestly branch of Mother Teresa's religious family, the Missionaries of Charity Fathers, at the time of their foundation in 1984.
He was ordained to the priesthood in June 1985 in the Ukrainian Catholic Church of St. John the Baptist in Newark, New Jersey, USA, by the late Metropolitan-Archbishop of Winnipeg, Maxim Hermaniuk, C.Ss.R.  In March 1999 he served as Mother Teresa's advocate in advancing the cause of her beatification and canonization. He was appointed director of the Mother Teresa Center.

Books

Mother Teresa: Come Be My Light (editor),  Doubleday, 2007

References

External links
Mother Teresa Center

20th-century Canadian Roman Catholic priests
People from Winnipeg
Living people
Year of birth missing (living people)
21st-century Canadian Roman Catholic priests